August Heinrich Matthiae (December 25, 1769January 6, 1835) was a German classical scholar.

Biography
He was born at Göttingen, and educated at the university. He then spent some years as a tutor in Amsterdam. In 1798 he returned to Germany, and in 1802 was appointed director of the Friedrichsgymnasium at Altenburg, which post he held till his death. His biography was written by his son Constantin, with the title A. Matthiä in seinem Leben und Wirken, etc. (1845).

Works
Of his numerous important works the best-known are:
 A copious Greek grammar, translated into English by V Blomfield, edited by John Kenrick (1832).
an edition of Euripides (9 vols., 1813–1829)
Grundriss der Geschichte der griechischen und römischen Litteratur (3rd ed., 1834, Eng. trans., Oxford, 1841)
Lehrbuch fur den ersten Unterricht in der Philosophie (3rd ed., 1833)
Encyklopädie und Methodologie der Philologie (1835)

Family
His brother, Friedrich Christian Matthiae (1763–1822), rector of the Frankfurt gymnasium, published editions of Seneca's Letters, Aratus, and Dionysius Periegetes.

References

External links
 
 

1769 births
1835 deaths
German classical scholars
Writers from Göttingen
University of Göttingen alumni
German classical philologists